APMSO Founding Day is a political festival observed by Muhajirs to celebrate the founding of the first Muhajir nationalist student union All Pakistan Muttahidda Students Organization.

Background 
On 11 June 1978 All Pakistan Mohair Students Organization was created by Altaf Hussain to provide muhajir university students a way to fight injustice. It became popular among students of Karachi University. Realism and Practical ism are the main philosophies celebrated that day.

Celebrations 
A large number of APMSO activists gather on the night of June 11 at the Mukka Chowk which used to be inscribed with the slogan, “Distance doesn’t matter”. From there, they march towards the residence of Altaf Hussain in Azizabad, also dubbed as Nine Zero, carrying candles and shouting slogans.

History

2009 
Syed Waqas Ali Shah and Ahsan Khan organised the 31st APMSO’s foundation day at Lal Qila ground, where poetry was recited.

2011 
The 33rd founding day of All Pakistan Muttahida Students’ Organization, in London, was marked here in a colourful ceremony of speeches, food and music.
Hundreds of Muttahida Quami Movement activists with their families from all over the UK attended the ceremony at the Brent Town Hall, which lasted for over 6 hours, and Pakistan's High Commissioner to the UK Wajid Shamusl Hasan attended the ceremony and congratulated the party, which started as a student group in Karachi campuses, for playing a key role in Pakistan's national politics.

2012 
On the occasion of APMSO's 34th founding day, Altaf Hussain addressed separate gatherings simultaneously in Karachi, Lahore, Hyderabad and other zonal centers including Rawlpindi via telephone.

2014 
On the occasion of APMSO's 34th founding day, Altaf Hussain speaking to a rally oraganised said he was ready to face cases against him being probed in London by the police.

2016 
On the occasion of its 38th founding day, All Pakistan Muttahida Students Organization (APMSO) organized a programme “the Renewal of Covenant of Faithfulness” at Khursheed Begum Secretariat, where the APMSO workers reaffirmed their pledge to be faithful to Altaf Hussain. All the workers and office-bearers of APMSO pledged to be loyal to the founder and leader of Muttahida Quami Movement Altaf Hussain.

In Saudi Arabia, Mohibban-e-Pakistan, a community welfare organization, celebrated the 38th Foundation Day of All Pakistan Muhajir Students Organization (APMSO) at Shadab Restaurant.

References

External links 
 

Muttahida Qaumi Movement
Muhajir culture
Muhajir nationalism